Damiano Rosatelli (born 4 November 1995) is an Italian fencer who won an individual gold medal at the 2019 Summer Universiade.
He won a gold medal in team foil, at the 2018 European Fencing Under 23 Championships.

Biography

See also
 Italy at the 2019 Summer Universiade

References

External links
 Damiano Rosatelli at FIS

1995 births
Living people
Italian male fencers
Universiade medalists in fencing
Universiade gold medalists for Italy
Fencers at the 2015 European Games
European Games medalists in fencing
European Games silver medalists for Italy
Medalists at the 2019 Summer Universiade